The Chinese Taipei national rugby union team represents the Republic of China (Taiwan) in international rugby union. Chinese Taipei have yet to make their debut at the Rugby World Cup, but have attempted to qualify since Wales 1999.

History

The team is referred to as "Chinese Taipei" rather than Taiwan or Republic of China for political reasons.

The Chinese Taipei finished at the top of their Round 2 pool in qualifying tournaments for the 1999 Rugby World Cup, winning both of their fixtures; defeating Sri Lanka and Malaysia. They advanced to Round 3, where they defeated Hong Kong.

In July, 2002 Chinese Taipei was in the unenviable position of being beaten by Japan 155-3. In May of the same year, Paraguay was beaten by the same margin by Argentina at 152-0, however, unlike Paraguay, Chinese Taipei scored some points in their match.

For qualifying tournaments for the 2003 Rugby World Cup in Australia, they won Pool A of Round 1, advancing to Round 2. There they faced both Hong Kong and China. The Chinese Taipei again finished at the top of the pool, winning both of their fixtures. The Chinese Taipei advanced to Round 3, however they lost their fixtures against Japan and Korea, knocking them out of the tournament. Their attempt to qualify for the 2007 Rugby World Cup was in Division 2, Round 1 of Asia qualifying.

World Cup record

 1987 - No qualifying tournament held
 1991 - 1995 - Did not enter
 1999 - 2015 - Did not qualify
 2019 Rugby World Cup - Did not enter

See also

 2003 Rugby World Cup - Asia qualification
 2007 Rugby World Cup - Asia qualification
 2011 Rugby World Cup - Asia qualification
 2015 Rugby World Cup – Asia qualification

External links
 Chinese Taipei on IRB.com
 Chinese Taipei  on RugbyData.com
 Chinese Taipei Rugby Football Union

References

 

 
Asian national rugby union teams
Rugby union in Taiwan